V. Priya is a Tamil film director. She worked as an assistant to director Mani Ratnam after learning her craft under Suhasini.

Career
Priya made her directorial debut with romantic-comedy Kanda Naal Mudhal (2005) starring Prasanna, Laila and Karthik Kumar. The film received positive critical acclaim during its release with critics praising "Priya deserves a pat on her back for weaving a gossamer romance like her mentor Mani sir did in Mounam Ragam or Alaipayuthe. But the film has its own minor drawbacks mostly in narration and lags especially in the second half". The film did well at box-office. However her second film Kannamoochi Yenada (2007) starring Prithviraj, Sandhya and Sathyaraj received mixed reviews from critics and was an average grosser.

In 2008, she planned a third project titled Cheri starring Prithviraj and Bhavana, but the film did not materialise. She alongside her husband Bhushan Kalyan worked as creative director for television series Uyirmei which was telecasted in Zee Tamil. After a long gap, she made her comeback to film direction with Aadi Lakshmi Purana which marks her debut in Kannada cinema.

Filmography

As an actor
Vikrant Rona (2022)

References

Tamil film directors
Living people
Indian women film directors
Tamil screenwriters
Indian women screenwriters
Year of birth missing (living people)